The Roses Tournament is an annual sports competition between Lancaster University and the University of York in England, often described as the largest inter-university sports tournament in Europe. It is organised by their respective Students' Unions, YUSU and LUSU. It takes its name from the 15th-century civil war, the Wars of the Roses, between the House of Lancaster and the House of York. The counties of Lancashire and Yorkshire are traditionally symbolized by the red and the white rose respectively, although York teams today play in gold and black kits. The competition is held every year during the early May bank holiday weekend, alternating its venue between the two universities.

History
The first event happened on 15 May 1965 after the Vice-Chancellor of York, Lord James of Rusholme, suggested a boat race between the two universities. The students amplified this idea and held a 5-day event with a variety of sports: rowing, table tennis, relay race, mixed field hockey, and tug of war.  The winner of each of the sports received two points, and the losing vice-chancellor presented a trophy to the winning university.
The event has continued to increase in size since its founding, with new events added every year (2004 had 37 different sports). Live coverage of the event is broadcast every year by a joint collaboration between the two university's student television stations YSTV and LA1:TV, and its two student radio stations, Bailrigg FM and University Radio York.  The importance of non-sporting social activities at the event has also been increased, with organised events on the Friday and Saturday evenings.

In the 2012 tournament a stadium was used for the first time. The Rugby 1sts XV battled it out at Huntington Stadium, the home of the York City Knights. During the 2013 tournament York opted to use the same venue again, for the second year running.

The Lancaster University Men's Hockey Club 4th Team, Lancaster Bombers American Football team and the Lancaster Trampolining team were the only teams to remain unbeaten in the history of the tournament to date going into Roses 2012, however all three teams lost to their York counterparts in 2012.

For the 50th battle of the Roses in 2014, the tournament was hosted at Lancaster, with the event highlighted with marketing across campus with players from all sports to boost morale. Lancaster created a purpose built stadium for first time which hosted both the opening and closing ceremony, as well as fixtures including women's rugby, men's rugby and archery. Wins were taken by Lancaster in sports that have previously been won by York annually, such as Rugby XV 3rds and 2nds, Men's Lacrosse and Badminton. The women's basketball fixture on the Sunday, won by Lancaster, took the university across the threshold needed to win the tournament. Octopush, a form of underwater hockey, was featured for the first time in the 2014 tournament. Bar sports were dominated by Lancaster, taking a whitewash in both pool and darts.

The 2015 tournament was officially opened by England football team manager Roy Hodgson and Football Association chairman Greg Dyke. The opening ceremony, which featured a series of boxing matches dubbed 'Friday Night Fight Night', was watched by 1,000 people in the University of York's Central Hall, with a further 5,000 people watching on large screens across campus. It was also the first year that one university had scored more than 200 points; however more point scoring activities are present now compared to 50 years ago.

Esports were introduced to the tournament for the first time in 2016 in the form of League of Legends, Dota 2 and Counter-Strike: Global Offensive.

The 2018 tournament saw the introduction of Dodgeball and Golf to the competition, as won by the Lancaster Royals.

In March 2020 it was announced that the event would be cancelled due to the COVID-19 pandemic. However, a competition was held with the Roses tournament being replaced by a Virtual Roses tournament which was won by York.

The first Roses following the COVID-19 pandemic saw the largest win margin of the tournament's history as Lancaster beat York 241 points to 102.

Results

Lancaster: 27 wins (23 home, 4 away)
York: 28 wins (24 home, 4 away)
Draws: 1

Current list of sports
The following sports were included in the 2022 edition of the tournament:

 American football
 Archery
 Badminton
 Ballroom dance
 Basketball
 Canoe polo
 Canoe slalom
 Cheerleading
 Chess
 Climbing
 Cricket
 Cycling
 Dance
 Darts
 Debating
 Equestrian
 Esports
 Fencing
 Football*
 Futsal
 Handball
 Hockey
 Korfball
 Lacrosse
 Mooting
 Netball*
 Pole fitness
 Pool
 Rowing
 Rugby union
 Running
 Sailing
 Snooker
 Snowsports
 Squash
 Swimming
 Table tennis
 Tennis
 Trampolining
 Ultimate Frisbee
 Underwater hockey
 Volleyball
 Water polo

* In addition to the University teams, football and netball also includes matches between each university's intercollegiate league champions. Postgraduate and medical society teams have also appeared in some years.

During the COVID-19 pandemic

Virtual Roses 2020

Summer Edition 
Due to the COVID-19 pandemic, the 2020 edition of the annual Roses Tournament to be held at Lancaster University was cancelled. As an alternative, Lancaster University Students' Union and York University Students' Union created a virtual tournament on Facebook. Events took place in the form of challenges that participants would have to provide photographic or video evidence for. Challenges of were judged by Lancaster SU Vice-President for Activities, Victoria Hatch and York Sport Union President, Maddi Cannell. The tournament took place between 1–2 May 2020 and was won by York by a score of 2337-1971.

Charity fundraising was also done alongside the tournament, with a total of over £5000 being raised.

Opening Ceremony 
The 'Opening Ceremony' for the tournament featured a number of video performances being uploaded to the Virtual Roses 2020 Facebook page on 1 May 2020. Sets were performed by Emily Millard, Lancaster's Brass Quintet, Lancaster's Clarinet Choir, Lancaster's Chamber Choir, Hamza Dalvi, Victoria Hatch, and Lancaster University Comedy Institute.

Events 
There was a mix of events that were open to all, events that were only open to members of specific societies, and events only competed by specific individuals. Most events awarded 50 points for 1st place, 30 points for 2nd place, and 20 points for 3rd place. Some events awarded points for the number of participants each University had. Some events awarded 100 points for the winner.

Winter Edition 
A winter edition of the Virtual Roses Tournament, to take place on Lancashire Day (27 November), was announced via the same Facebook page that hosted the summer edition on 17 November 2020. Lancaster won by a score of 40-22.

Roses Unlocked 2021 
Due to the COVID-19 pandemic, the 2021 edition of the annual Roses Tournament to be held at York University was cancelled. As an alternative, Lancaster University Students' Union and York University Students' Union created "Roses Unlocked". Events took place in the form of a pentathlon consisting of a sprint, running, a static erg, a swim and a cycle between most uni sports teams and were live-streamed online. The tournament took place between 30 April–2 May 2021. York won by a score of 115-57.

References

External links
York Sport Union
Roses Live

Sport in Lancaster, Lancashire
Sport in York
Lancaster University
University of York
Student sport rivalries in the United Kingdom
Culture of Lancaster University